Nobap (English: Pomelo) is a 2009 Indian Meitei language film directed by Heisnam Tomba and written and produced by Suresh Hidang. It stars Raju Nong, Gokul Athokpam, Abenao Elangbam and Ranjana with master Denil, master Chingkheinganba, master Santosh, master Oliver Chiru, master Russel, master Robinson, master Biken and master Chingkhei in the lead roles. There is also special appearance of international footballer Renedy Singh in the film. It was the opening film at the 2nd Guwahati Film Festival 2009.

Nobap was also screened at Jawaharlal Nehru University (JNU), New Delhi on 13 January 2011.

Synopsis
The movie tells the story of eight kids and is set in a remote village of Manipur. They are in desperate need of a football. Unable to afford one, the boys end up kicking Nobap instead. Thambou, a driver of an old model jeep shuttles between town areas and the village. The benevolent driver with the help of his friend Thanou sees that the boys get a leather ball and participate in a seven a side football tournament. The film is intercut with humorous romantic interludes - Thambou and Thaja; Thanou and Thoibi.

Cast
 Raju Nong as Thambou
 Gokul Athokpam as Thanou
 Abenao Elangbam as Thaja
 Ranjana as Thoibi
 Master Denil
 Master Chingkheinganba
 Master Santosh
 Master Oliver Chiru
 Master Russel
 Master Robinson
 Master Biken
 Master Chingkhei
 R.K. Sorojini Devi as Thambou's mother
 Ayekpam Shanti
 Dhonen
 Renedy Singh (Special Appearance)

Production
This film is the second production of The Second Millennium Mongoloids after producing the blockbuster film Meera Memcha.

Accolades
Nobap won 9 awards at the 7th Manipur State Film Festival 2010, including the Best Feature Film award.

Reception
R. K. Bidur Singh wrote in e-pao.org, "Making an enterprising team with Suresh Hidang, producer-writer-lyricist, Y. Kumarjit, screen playwright, Hodam Tommy and K. Boong, cinematographer and editor, O.Geet, music director etc., he comes up with a non-conventional film-Nobap. The plight of rural folks and eight kids in desperate need of football, but unable to afford one, kicking Nobap instead-are all well expressed in a comprehensible visual language. The film is skilfully intercut with humorous romantic interludes-Thambou and Thaja; Thanou and Thoibi.Nobap is not a story that somebody tells you just to make you feel sorry for the poor people, it has other meaning and a shot's meaning can go very far beyond the subject. The film would have been better if a few sequences, such as apparent abduction of Thambou and child kidnapping for forced labour had been trimmed. They are neither sensibly treated nor developed as meaningful sub-plot.

★★★ : One for story-screenplay, one for sincerity and realistic attempt at the film making, one for eight frolicsome kids."

Soundtrack
Bishe Moirangthem, Tomba Thangjam and Mangangsana composed the soundtrack for the film and  wrote the lyrics. The songs are titled Laklo Thadoi Laklo Thoinu, Houda Houjillu Thok a ba Ama Lakchani and Pallubana Thamoi Ama''.

External links

References

Meitei-language films
2009 films